The Finnish men's national ice hockey team, nicknamed Leijonat / Lejonen ("The Lions" in Finnish and Swedish), is governed by the Finnish Ice Hockey Association. Finland is one of the most successful national ice hockey teams in the world and a member of the so-called "Big Six", the unofficial group of the six strongest men's ice hockey nations, along with Canada, the United States, the Czech Republic, Russia, and Sweden.

Finland won the world championship in 2022, their fourth title after 1995, 2011 and 2019. A duo of silver medals (1988, 2006) remained the country's best Olympic results until 2022 when the Finns achieved a breakthrough by winning their first ever Olympic gold after defeating Russia. At the Canada/World Cup, their best achievement is also a silver medal which they won in 2004.

History
Finland's first appearance in an elite ice hockey competition was at the 1939 Ice Hockey World Championships in Switzerland. The result was a shared last place with Yugoslavia. 10 years later, Finland came to the 1949 Ice Hockey World Championships in Sweden. The Finns finished in 7th place by winning the consolation round. Finland's first appearance at the Winter Olympics occurred in 1952 in Oslo.

In the 1974 Men's World Ice Hockey Championships two players were suspended for doping. They were the Swede Ulf Nilsson and the Finn Stig Wetzell who failed a drug test for the forbidden substance ephedrine. Both players were suspended for the rest of the tournament. Nilsson failed the test after Sweden's game against Poland, which Sweden won 4–1. The game was awarded to Poland as a 5–0 forfeit. The Finn, Wetzell, failed the test after Finland's match against Czechoslovakia, which Finland won 5–2, meaning the game was awarded to Czechoslovakia as a 5–0 forfeit. The Finns were able to defeat Czechoslovakia again on the last day, which would have earned their first medal in history, if not for the points lost in the forfeited win.

Finland was close again to winning the first medal in its history at the 1986 Men's World Ice Hockey Championships, when it led 4–2 in the final minute of the medal round match against Sweden. However, in the last minute of the match Anders "Masken" Carlsson first narrowed Finland's lead to one goal and then leveled the score with the help of the Finns' mistake. The match eventually ended in a 4–4 draw, meaning Finland's ranking in the tournament was fourth place.

At the 1992 Men's Ice Hockey World Championships, Finland's success and silver medal came as a surprise to many Finns, as the team was not expected to much because of inexperience and the lack of success at the 1992 Albertville Winter Olympics in the same year. The medal achieved in the tournament was the first World Championship medal and the second value medal after the 1988 Calgary Winter Olympics, where Finland clinched a surprise silver after defeating the USSR.

At the 1995 Men's World Ice Hockey Championships, Finland achieved its first ever gold in international ice hockey. The Finns reached the final with a 5–0 victory over France in the quarter-finals, and a 3–0 victory over the Czech Republic in the semi-finals. In the final, Finland faced off against their hockey rivals and host of the 1995 tournament, Sweden. In the first period of the final, left wing Ville Peltonen scored a natural hat-trick, and then assisted Timo Jutila's first period goal to give Finland a 4–0 lead, on the way to an eventual 4–1 victory.

At the 1998 Olympic men's ice hockey tournament, Team Finland came away with bronze, after defeating the Canadian national team 3–2. Teemu Selänne led the tournament in goals scored (4) and total points achieved (10). The tournament was the first in which players from the National Hockey League (NHL) were allowed to participate, allowing national teams to be constructed using the best possible talent from each country. The 1998 Olympic tournament therefore came to be known as the Tournament of the Century.

At the 2006 Winter Olympics, Finland won a silver medal, coming close to winning in the final but losing 3–2 to Sweden. Finland's goaltender Antero Niittymäki was named the MVP of the tournament (with only eight goals conceded throughout the whole tournament) and Teemu Selänne was voted best forward. The format was changed from the 1998 and 2002 tournaments, to a format similar to the 1992 and 1994 tournaments. The number of teams was reduced from 14 to 12. The 12 teams were split into two groups in the preliminary stage, which followed a round robin format. Each team played the other teams in their group once. The top four teams from each group advanced to the quarter-finals.

At the 2006 IIHF World Championship, Finland achieved third place after winning the bronze medal game against Canada. Petteri Nummelin was named to the Media All-Star Team.

At the 2007 IIHF World Championship, Finland lost the final to the Canadian team. The final marked the second time that Finland and Canada met in the gold medal game of a World Championship, the first time being in 1994. However, only a year before, in 2006 Finland had defeated Canada 5–0 in the bronze medal game. In 2007, Canada were looking on form, being undefeated coming into the playoff round, while Finland had registered two losses in the run-up to the finals. Rick Nash scored on the powerplay at 6:10 into the first period on a one-timer from the point from a pass by Cory Murphy off of Matthew Lombardi, to put Canada up 1–0. Near the middle of the period, Eric Staal scored in similar fashion also on the powerplay, assisted by Justin Williams, and Mike Cammalleri. 9:11 into the second period, Colby Armstrong scored to give the Canadians a 3–0 lead. This goal ended up as the game winner. Finland had some discipline difficulty in the first two periods, taking 6 minutes apiece in penalties in both periods. The Finns started to bring up the pressure in the last ten minutes, and Petri Kontiola scored a nice glove-side goal on Ward at 51:08 assisted by Ville Peltonen, to put the team on the board. With only 3 minutes left Antti Miettinen scored to bring Finland within one, 3–2. However, just one minute later Rick Nash scored on a skillful breakaway to put the game away, with Canada winning 4–2 and clinching the title. The Canadians were outshot 22–18, but their goaltender, Cam Ward, kept Canada in the game as he was solid between the pipes. They also were able to capitalize on the powerplay, which ended up being decisive in the Canadian win. Kari Lehtonen was voted Tournament's best goaltender.

At the 2008 IIHF World Championship, Finland achieved third place after winning the bronze medal game 4–0 against rivals Sweden.

At the 2010 Winter Olympics, Finland again came away with the bronze, winning 5–3 against Slovakia. During the tournament, Teemu Selänne became the all-time leader for points scored in the Olympics. He notched an assist in his second game of the tournament for 37 career points, surpassing Valeri Kharlamov of the Soviet Union, Vlastimil Bubník of Czechoslovakia, and Harry Watson of Canada.

At the 2011 IIHF World Championship, Finland won its second world title, beating the Swedish national team by a score of 6–1 in the final. As two highly ranked neighboring countries, Sweden and Finland have a long-running competitive tradition in ice hockey. Before the game, mainstream media in both countries titled the match "a dream final". After a goalless first period, Sweden opened the game with a 1–0 goal by Magnus Pääjärvi in the second period at 27:40. Seven seconds before the period's end, Finland's Jarkko Immonen scored to tie the game 1–1. Finland took the lead early in the third period, scoring two goals at 42:35 and 43:21 by Nokelainen and Kapanen. Sweden then took a time-out with ten minutes left to play but did not manage to regroup, and Finland scored a further three goals courtesy of Janne Pesonen, Mika Pyörälä and Antti Pihlström to clinch the title. Team Finland's Jarkko Immonen led the tournament in both goals and points scored, with 9 and 12 respectively.

The Finns won their third world title at the 2019 IIHF World Championship in Slovakia, and after the cancelled tournament of 2020, they reached the final in the 2021 tournament, losing to Canada in overtime.

At the 2022 Winter Olympics, Finland won the gold medal for the first time, going undefeated and beating Russia in the final. This allowed them to rise to first place in the IIHF World Ranking for the first time ever. In May 2022, Finland won their fourth World Championship, beating Canada in overtime after a hard-fought game. This was the third Canada–Finland final in a row, and the first time the Finns won a medal on home ice.

Tournament record

Olympic Games

World Championship

Canada Cup / World Cup

Euro Hockey Tour
1996–97 – Finished in 
1997–98 – Finished in 
1998–99 – Finished in 
1999–00 – Finished in 
2000–01 – Finished in 
2001–02 – Finished in 
2002–03 – Finished in 
2003–04 – Finished in 
2004–05 – Finished in 
2005–06 – Finished in 
2006–07 – Finished in 4th place
2007–08 – Finished in 
2008–09 – Finished in 
2009–10 – Finished in 
2010–11 – Finished in 
2011–12 – Finished in 
2012–13 – Finished in 
2013–14 – Finished in 
2014–15 – Finished in 
2015–16 – Finished in 
2016–17 – Finished in 
2017–18 – Finished in 
2018–19 – Finished in 
2019–20 – Finished in 
2020–21 – Finished in 4th place
2021–22 – Finished in

EHT Medal table

Tournament summary
Karjala Tournament:
 Gold medal (1996, 1998, 1999, 2000, 2001, 2002, 2003, 2004, 2005, 2010, 2013, 2017)
 Silver medal (1995, 2009, 2011, 2012, 2014, 2015, 2018, 2019, 2021)
 Bronze medal (2016, 2020)
Channel One Cup / Izvestia Trophy:
 Gold medal (2003, 2009, 2021)
 Silver medal (1982, 2002, 2004, 2005, 2006, 2007, 2008, 2013, 2014, 2018)
 Bronze medal (1968, 1971, 1973, 1979, 1980, 1984, 1989, 1994, 1996, 1998, 1999, 2000, 2012, 2015, 2016, 2017, 2019)
Sweden Hockey Games:
 Gold medal (1997, 1999, 2000, 2010, 2013, 2014, 2018)
 Silver medal (2001 (February), 2006, 2008)
 Bronze medal (1991, 1998, 2001 (November), 2009, 2011, 2020, 2021)
Czech Hockey Games:
 Gold medal (1996, 2000, 2001, 2003, 2012, 2013 (August))
 Silver medal (1997, 1998, 1999, 2006, 2017, 2018, 2019)
 Bronze medal (2008, 2009 (April), 2009 (September), 2011, 2021)

Finland's Euro Hockey Tour (EHT) Cup medal table
As of the 2018 Channel One Cup:

Euro Hockey Challenge
2011 – 
2012 – 
2013 – 
2014 – 
2015 – 
2016 – 
2017 – 
2018 –

Other tournaments
Deutschland Cup:  Gold medal (1990)
Nissan Cup:  Gold medal (1989, 1994)
Spengler Cup:  Silver medal (1975)

Current roster
Roster for the 2022 IIHF World Championship.

Head coach: Jukka Jalonen

Uniform evolution

Retired jerseys

Notable players

Keijo Kuusela 1948–1952
Aarne Honkavaara 1948–1952
Unto Wiitala 1949–1957
Teppo Rastio 1954–1962
Raimo Kilpiö 1957–1967
Heino Pulli 1958–1965
Matti Keinonen 1962–1973
Urpo Ylönen 1963–1978
Lasse Oksanen 1964–1977
Lalli Partinen 1965–1973
Esa Peltonen 1967–1980
Veli-Pekka Ketola 1968–1981
Heikki Riihiranta 1970–1976
Juhani Tamminen 1970–1982
Pekka Rautakallio 1972–1983
Matti Hagman 1975–1987
Reijo Ruotsalainen 1978–1989
Kari Eloranta 1979–1992
Jari Kurri 1979–1998
Hannu Kamppuri 1981–1987
Ilkka Sinisalo 1981–1983
Petri Skriko 1982–1992
Christian Ruuttu 1984–1996
Timo Jutila 1983–1997
Raimo Helminen 1983–2008
Timo Blomqvist 1985–1992
Jukka Tammi 1985–1998
Esa Tikkanen 1985–2000
Markus Ketterer 1987–1996
Jarmo Myllys 1987–2001
Janne Ojanen 1987–2002
Teppo Numminen 1987–2006
Jyrki Lumme 1988–2002
Mika Nieminen 1991–1998
Teemu Selänne 1991–2014
Jere Lehtinen 1992–2010
Saku Koivu 1993–2010
Sami Kapanen 1994–2010
Ville Peltonen 1994–2012
Ari Sulander 1995–2003
Janne Niinimaa 1995–2009
Petteri Nummelin 1995–2010
Kimmo Timonen 1996–2014
Olli Jokinen 1997–2014
Jarkko Ruutu 1998–2010
Jere Karalahti 1998–2014
Miikka Kiprusoff 1999–2010
Sami Salo 2001–2014
Niklas Hagman 2002–2013
Ville Nieminen 2002–2006
Mikko Koivu 2003–2016
Jussi Jokinen 2003–2016
Tuomo Ruutu 2004–2015
Pekka Rinne 2004–2016
Tuukka Rask 2005–2016
Antti Pihlström 2008–
Leo Komarov 2009–
Valtteri Filppula 2010–
Mikael Granlund 2010–
Teuvo Teräväinen 2012–
Marko Anttila 2013–
Aleksander Barkov Jr. 2013–
Olli Määttä 2014–
Erik Haula 2014–
Juuse Saros 2014–
Sebastian Aho 2015–
Mikko Rantanen 2015–
Patrik Laine 2016–
Sakari Manninen 2018–
Eeli Tolvanen 2018–
Miro Heiskanen 2018–
Kaapo Kakko 2019–
Juho Olkinuora 2019–
Anton Lundell 2021–

List of head coaches

Erkki Saarinen 1939–1941
Risto Lindroos 1945–1946
Henry Kvist 1946–1949
Risto Lindroos 1950–1954
Aarne Honkavaara 1954–1959
Joe Wirkkunen 1959–1960
Derek Holmes 1960–1961
Joe Wirkkunen 1961–1966
Augustin "Gustav" Bubník 1966–1969
Seppo Liitsola 1969–1972
Len Lunde 1972–1973
Kalevi Numminen 1973–1974
Seppo Liitsola 1974–1976
Lasse Heikkilä 1976–1977
Kalevi Numminen 1977–1982
Alpo Suhonen 1982–1986
Rauno Korpi 1986–1987
Pentti Matikainen 1987–1993
Curt Lindström 1993–1997
Hannu Aravirta 1997–2003
Raimo Summanen 2003–2004
Erkka Westerlund 2004–2007
Doug Shedden 2007–2008
Jukka Jalonen 2008–2013
Erkka Westerlund 2013–2014
Kari Jalonen 2014–2016
Lauri Marjamäki 2016–18
Jukka Jalonen 2018–

References

External links

IIHF profile
National teams of ice hockey

 
Ice hockey teams in Finland
National ice hockey teams in Europe